"Rowdy Rowdy" is the second single released by rapper 50 Cent, following the release of "How to Rob". The song was used for the soundtrack of the film In Too Deep along with "How to Rob" and contains the line "These industry niggas is startin' to look like somethin' to eat" from that song. The song is accompanied with a music video, along with "Life's on the Line", which features clips from the film. "Rowdy Rowdy" contains a sample from Johnny Harris's "Light My Fire".

Track listing
 "Rowdy Rowdy" (Explicit version)
 "Rowdy Rowdy" (Clean version)
 "Rowdy Rowdy" (Instrumental)
 "Rowdy Rowdy" (A capella)

References

1999 singles
50 Cent songs
Songs written by 50 Cent
Song recordings produced by Trackmasters
Columbia Records singles
1999 songs